Oregon Route 70 is an Oregon state highway that runs between the towns of Dairy, and Bonanza in south-central Oregon  The highway is known as the Dairy-Bonanza Highway No. 23 (see Oregon highways and routes) and is signed east-to-west.

Route description

Oregon Route 70 begins (at its western terminus) at an intersection with Oregon Route 140 in the town of Dairy.  It heads east-southeast for seven miles (11 km), ending in the city of Bonanza.

History 

The Dairy-Bonanza Highway was established in 1917.  When the Oregon route numbering system was introduced in 1932, the highway was assigned the number OR 70.  There have been no major changes to the highway since its establishment.

Major intersections

References 

 Oregon Department of Transportation, Descriptions of US and Oregon Routes, https://web.archive.org/web/20051102084300/http://www.oregon.gov/ODOT/HWY/TRAFFIC/TEOS_Publications/PDF/Descriptions_of_US_and_Oregon_Routes.pdf, page 11.
 Oregon Highways, Dairy-Bonanza Highway #23 (Archive), https://web.archive.org/web/20050208055644/http://www.ylekot.com/orehwys/hwy-23.html

070
Transportation in Klamath County, Oregon